Thierry Cotting (born 13 September 1963) is a Swiss football manager.

References

1963 births
Living people
Swiss football managers
Étoile Carouge FC managers
FC Lausanne-Sport managers
Servette FC managers